Daejeon Subway Line 1 is a subway line is located in Daejeon, South Korea. After excluding the Seoul metropolitan area, it was the fourth subway line created in Korea, following Busan, Daegu, and Gwangju. Its line color is ● green. It is the first of five planned lines for the Daejeon Metro. 

The first section was opened on March 16, 2006, the second on April 17, 2007. The track leads from Banseok station in Yuseong-gu to Panam station in Dong-gu. 2029 is the tentative opening date of a 14-kilometer extension from Banseok to Government Complex Sejong

Formation
In 1991, the Daejeon Metropolitan City Urban Railway Construction Plan was established. In January 1994, the Subway Planning Unit was established. In February 1996, the basic plan for subway construction, which links the old city center of Daejeon metropolitan city with the new city center, was confirmed. The subway construction headquarters was established in April 1996, and construction of the first line of Daejeon subway line was started in October of the same year.

Stations

See also
Transportation in South Korea

References

External links
Official website 
Network Map

Daejeon Metro
Subway Line 1, Daejeon
Underground rapid transit in South Korea